The HP 200A was the first product made by Hewlett-Packard and was manufactured in David Packard's garage in Palo Alto, California.

It was a low-distortion audio oscillator used for testing sound equipment. It used the Wien bridge oscillator circuit, that had been the subject of Bill Hewlett's Masters thesis. It was also the first such commercial oscillator to use a simple light bulb as the temperature-dependent resistor in its feedback network. The light bulb was an inexpensive and effective automatic gain control that not only kept the oscillator output amplitude constant, but it also kept the oscillator's loop gain near unity.  The latter is a key technique for achieving a low distortion oscillator. Earlier, Larned Meacham had used light bulbs in bridge circuits to stabilize and linearize oscillators in 1938. 

The product code was chosen to give the impression that HP was an established company.  Walt Disney bought eight of them for use in the production of Fantasia.

The circuit diagram is shown in Hewlett's 1939 patent.

Development 
Through the 1940s and into the 1950s, the subsequent versions of the 200A covered different and wider frequency ranges.  The latest version was the 200CD; it covered from the subaudio 5 Hz to the low end (Long Wave) of the AM radio band at 600 kilohertz.  The 200CD became a ubiquitous audio generator in engineering laboratories worldwide from the 1950s to the 1990s.

Operation 

William R. Hewlett's Wien bridge oscillator can be considered as a combination of a differential amplifier and a Wien bridge, connected in a positive feedback loop between the amplifier output and differential inputs. At the oscillating frequency, the bridge is almost balanced and has very small transfer ratio. The loop gain is a product of the very high amplifier gain and the very low bridge ratio.  In Hewlett's circuit, the amplifier is implemented by two vacuum tubes.  The amplifier's inverting input is the cathode of tube V1 and the non-inverting input is the control grid of tube V2.  To simplify analysis, all the components other than R1, R2, C1 and C2 can be modeled as a non-inverting amplifier with a gain of 1+Rf/Rb and with a high input impedance.  R1, R2, C1 and C2 form a bandpass filter which is connected to provide positive feedback at the frequency of oscillation. Rb self heats and increases the negative feedback which reduces the amplifier gain until the point is reached that there is just enough gain to sustain sinusoidal oscillation without over driving the amplifier.  If R1 = R2 and C1 = C2 then at equilibrium Rf/Rb = 2 and the amplifier gain is 3. When the circuit is first energized, the lamp is cold and the gain of the circuit is greater than 3 which ensures start up. The dc bias current of vacuum tube V1 also flows through the lamp.  This does not change the principles of the circuit's operation, but it does reduce the amplitude of the output at equilibrium because the bias current provides part of the heating of the lamp.

References

External links
 HP200A manual (1951) at HP archive

Hewlett-Packard products
Electronic oscillators
Products introduced in 1939